Martin Finn (born 1979) is an Irish hurler who currently plays as a full-forward at senior level for the London county team.

Finn began his inter-county career as a member of the Cork under-21 hurling team. After emigrating from Ireland he subsequently linked up with the New York and London senior hurling teams. As an inter-county hurler, he has won one Christy Ring Cup winners' medal and one Nicky Rackard Cup winners' medal. Finn has ended up as an Ulster runner-up on one occasion.

At the club level, Finn is a two-time county senior championship medalist with St Gabriel's. He previously won a county junior championship medal with Dromina.

References

1979 births
Living people
Cork hurlers 
Dromina hurlers
Irish electricians
Irish expatriate sportspeople in England
Irish expatriate sportspeople in the United States
London inter-county hurlers
New York hurlers
St Gabriel's hurlers